Bexton Hall is a country house in the village of Bexton to the southwest of Knutsford, Cheshire, England.  It is a square, symmetrical house of five bays, dating from the late 17th century.  It is constructed in brick, with slate roofs, and has two storeys plus a basement.  The house is recorded in the National Heritage List for England as a designated Grade II* listed building, and is the only listed building in Bexton parish.  The forecourt walls are included in the listing.  The house originally had a cupola, but this is no longer present.

See also

Grade II* listed buildings in Cheshire East

References

Houses completed in the 17th century
Country houses in Cheshire
Grade II* listed buildings in Cheshire
Grade II* listed houses